Cobb is a 1994 American biographical film starring Tommy Lee Jones as baseball player Ty Cobb. The film was written and directed by Ron Shelton and based on a 1994 book by Al Stump. The original music score was composed by Elliot Goldenthal. The film is told through the partnership between Cobb and sportswriter Al Stump who served as a ghostwriter of Cobb's autobiography. Some critics lauded the film and Jones's performance, but the box office results for the film were underwhelming.

Plot
Sportswriter Al Stump is hired in 1960 to serve as ghostwriter of an authorized autobiography of baseball player Tyrus Raymond "Ty" Cobb. Now 74 and in failing health, Cobb wants an official biography to "set the record straight" before he dies.

Stump arrives at Cobb's Lake Tahoe estate to write the official life story of the first baseball player inducted into the National Baseball Hall of Fame. He finds a continually-drunken, misanthropic, bitter racist who abuses his biographer as well as everyone else he comes in contact with. Although Cobb's home is luxurious, it is without heat, power and running water due to long-running violent disputes between Cobb and utility companies. Cobb also rapidly runs through domestic workers, hiring and firing them in quick succession.

Although Cobb is seriously ill and prone to frequent physical breakdown, he retains considerable strength and also keeps several loaded firearms within easy reach at almost all times, making the outbreak of violent confrontation always an immediate possibility in his presence. 

Cobb almost gets killed in an automobile accident off the Donner Pass, driving recklessly in a blizzard. Stump rescues him, but Cobb then seizes control of Stump's car until he gets into another accident. The car has to be towed to Reno. Stump, by this point, is disillusioned enough by Cobb that he begins writing less-than-flattering notes for his book. When Cobb, one morning, gets a look at Stump's notes, describing Cobb as "pathetic, paranoid, and lost in the past", Cobb flies into a rage, mocking Stump as only a moderate success, and then gleefully informing Stump that only Cobb has final editorial approval of his biography. To Stump's surprise, it is at this point that Cobb also begins to open up about one of the defining events of his childhood: the murder of his father by his unfaithful mother, but he makes clear that he was already, in his words, "a prick" before and after it happened.

Stump and Cobb go see a show at a Reno resort hotel featuring Keely Smith and Louis Prima, whose act Cobb rudely interrupts. A cigarette girl, Ramona, becomes interested in Stump, but when Cobb barges into the hotel room, he's in a jealous rage. He knocks Stump out cold and takes Ramona to another room, where he physically abuses her. When Stump wakes up just in time to see Ramona running out of Cobb's room, angrily mocking him as "Georgia trash", he finally makes his decision to write an honest biography of Cobb. Mindful of Cobb's temper and his editorial approval, Stump continues writing Cobb's preferred version, My Life in Baseball, the one Cobb expects, while secretly handwriting notes for his real book, a sensational, merciless account on the ballplayer, on hotel stationary, napkins, and other pieces of paper. Stump plans to complete Cobb's version while he is still alive, guaranteeing his payment for the project and letting Cobb die happy, then issuing the hard-hitting follow-up after Cobb is gone. Meanwhile, Cobb and Stump's time in Reno is cut short after Cobb, spotting Ramona and Cobb's ex-housekeeper Willie laughing together at the craps table, flies into a shooting rampage in the casino.

Cobb and Stump travel together cross-country by automobile, with Cobb dictating his story to Stump during the day, while Stump continues secretly writing his real book at night. Finally, both men arrive at the Baseball Hall of Fame's induction weekend in Cooperstown, New York, where many star players from Cobb's era are in attendance, including Rogers Hornsby and Mickey Cochrane. Cobb is haunted by images from his violent past as he views film footage of his career. That night, despite the players' tribute to Cobb's career, many of the same men refuse to allow him to enter the hotel after-party, having finally been fed up with his bad behavior. 

From there, Cobb and Stump drive south to Cobb's native Georgia, where his estranged daughter continues to live. She refuses to see him. Stump, despite having spent months with Cobb witnessing his behavior and absorbing considerable abuse, finds himself torn between releasing the autobiography that Cobb hired him to write and putting his own book out instead. 

During their time together, Cobb begins to regard Stump as a friend of sorts, as it becomes clear his conduct has driven away virtually all his legitimate friends and family. Stump, despite his general disgust of Cobb as a person, still gains a grudging respect for the player's legendary intensity, no-holds-barred honesty, and fearsome competitive fire, as well as an understanding that, despite Cobb's denial, the murder of Cobb's father may have been partly responsible for his antagonistic personality. Cobb reveals to Stump that his father's murder was not committed by his mother, but by his mother's lover.

After a long night of drinking when his own personal life begins to unravel, Stump passes out. Cobb discovers his notes for the no-punches-pulled version, bringing on an epic explosion.

Betrayed, Cobb prepares to shoot himself with one of his guns when he suddenly begins to cough up blood and is taken to a hospital, where he wields his gun and treats doctors and nurses as harshly as he has everyone else. Stump meets up with him at the hospital where Cobb begrudgingly gives Stump permission to tell the true story, even admitting he respects Stump for "beating" him, in a sense, by fooling Cobb the whole time about his true intentions. Before Stump leaves, Cobb only asks the writer to remember that "The desire for glory is not a sin."

Stump finishes both versions of Cobb's biography by the time Cobb finally dies in July 1961. In the end, however, Stump decides to publish the glowing autobiography Cobb hired him to write.

Cast
Tommy Lee Jones as Ty Cobb
Robert Wuhl as Al Stump
Lolita Davidovich as Ramona
Lou Myers as Willie
William Utay as Jameson
J. Kenneth Campbell as William Herschel Cobb
Rhoda Griffis as Amanda Chitwood Cobb
Roger Clemens as Opposing pitcher
Stephen Mendillo as Mickey Cochrane
Tommy Bush as Rogers Hornsby
Stacy Keach, Sr. as Jimmie Foxx
Crash Davis as Sam Crawford
Rath Shelton as Paul Waner
Jim Shelton as Lloyd Waner
Reid Cruickshanks as Pie Traynor
Eloy Casados as Louis Prima
Paula Rudy as Keely Smith
Bradley Whitford as Process Server
Brian Patrick Mulligan as Charlie Chaplin
Jimmy Buffett as Heckler

Production
Baseball scenes were filmed in Birmingham, Alabama at Rickwood Field, which stood in for Philadelphia's Shibe Park and Pittsburgh's Forbes Field. Scenes also were filmed in Cobb's actual hometown of Royston, Georgia.

Much of the Cobb location filming was in northern Nevada. The hotel check-in was at the Morris Hotel on Fourth Street in Reno. Casino, outdoor and entry shots were done outside Cactus Jack's Hotel and Casino in Carson City and outside the then-closed, now-reopened (2007) Doppelganger's Bar in Carson City.

Baseball announcer Ernie Harwell, a Ford Frick Award recipient, is featured as emcee at a Cooperstown, New York awards banquet. Real-life sportswriters Allan Malamud, Doug Krikorian, and Jeff Fellenzer and boxing publicist Bill Caplan appear in the movie's opening and closing scenes at a Santa Barbara bar as Stump's friends and fellow scribes.

Carson City free-lance photographer Bob Wilkie photographed many still scenes for Nevada Magazine, the Associated Press, and the Nevada Appeal.

Tommy Lee Jones was shooting this film when he won the Academy Award for Best Supporting Actor for The Fugitive. As his head was already partially shaved in the front for his role as the balding, 72-year-old Cobb, the actor made light of the situation in his acceptance speech: "All a man can say at a time like this is, 'I am not really bald ... But I do have work." In addition to his partially shaved head, Jones also endured a broken ankle, suffered while practicing Cobb's distinctive slide.

The film shows Cobb sharpening his spikes as a means to keep infielders from tagging him out as he ran the bases, and was accused of spiking several players who tried. Cobb, however, always denied ever spiking anyone on purpose. Tyler Logan Cobb, a descendant of Cobb's, played "Young Ty".

Reception

Box office
The film opened in limited release in December 1994. It earned a reported $1,007,583 at the U.S. box office.

Critical response
Cobb currently has a 65% rating on Rotten Tomatoes based on 48 reviews. The site's consensus states: "Tommy Lee Jones's searing performance helps to elevate Cobb above your typical sports biopic; he's so effective, in fact, that some may find the film unpleasant." Peter Travers of Rolling Stone hailed it as "one of the year's best" and Charles Taylor of Salon included it on his list of the best films of the decade. Others took a harsher view of the picture. Owen Glieberman of Entertainment Weekly gave the film a "D", claiming it to be a "noisy, cantankerous buddy picture" and presented Cobb as little more than a "septuagenarian crank". He noted that while the film had constant reminders of Cobb's records, it had little actual baseball in it, besides one flashback where Cobb is seen getting on base, then stealing third and home, and instigating a brawl with the opposing team. He explained: "By refusing to place before our eyes Ty Cobb's haunted ferocity as a baseball player, it succeeds in making him look even worse than he was."

Roger Ebert's review of December 2, 1994 in the Chicago Sun-Times described Cobb as one of the most original biopics ever made and including "one of Tommy Lee Jones's best performances," but he notes Stump (played by Wuhl) and his lack of development in the film.

Year-end 'Best' lists 
 7th – Peter Rainer, Los Angeles Times
 9th – Peter Travers, Rolling Stone
 Top 10 (not ranked) – George Meyer, The Ledger
 Honorable mention – Robert Denerstein, Rocky Mountain News

Historical accuracy
In his 2015 book Ty Cobb: A Terrible Beauty, author Charles Leerhsen asserts that the film is based on Al Stump's 1961 and 1994 biographies of Ty Cobb, books noted for glaring inaccuracies regarding Cobb's life, as well as a True magazine article, also by Stump, published after Cobb's death. When the author Leerhsen contacted director Shelton concerning the inaccuracies, Shelton refused to provide documentation for some of the most extravagant aspects of the movie, and admitted to fabricating scenes along with "Al" because they believed it was something the real Cobb could have plausibly done in real life.

Previously, in 2010, an article by William R. Cobb (no relation to Ty) in the peer-reviewed The National Pastime, the official publication of the Society for American Baseball Research, had accused Al Stump of extensive forgeries of Cobb-related baseball and personal memorabilia, including personal documents and diaries. Stump even falsely claimed to possess a shotgun used by Cobb's mother to kill his father (in a well-known 1905 incident officially ascribed to Mrs Cobb having mistaken her husband for an intruder). The shotgun later came into the hands of noted memorabilia collector Barry Halper. Despite the shotgun's notoriety, official newspaper and court documents of the time clearly show Cobb's father had been killed with a pistol. The article, and later expanded book, further accused Stump of numerous false statements about Cobb, not only during and immediately after their 1961 collaboration but also in Stump's later years, most of which were sensationalistic in nature and intended to cast Cobb in an unflattering light. Cobb's peer-reviewed research indicates that all of Stump's works (print and memorabilia) surrounding Ty Cobb are at the very best called into question and at worst "should be dismiss(ed) out of hand as untrue".

See also
 List of American films of 1994
 Cobb (soundtrack)

References

External links
 
 
 
 

1994 films
1990s biographical drama films
1990s sports drama films
American sports drama films
American baseball films
American biographical drama films
Biographical films about sportspeople
Sports films based on actual events
Films directed by Ron Shelton
Regency Enterprises films
Warner Bros. films
Films set in 1905
Films set in 1960
Films set in Georgia (U.S. state)
Films shot in Alabama
Films scored by Elliot Goldenthal
Ty Cobb
Cultural depictions of Charlie Chaplin
Cultural depictions of baseball players
1990s English-language films
1990s American films
Films about Major League Baseball